Neil Habig (born September 6, 1936) was an offensive lineman and linebacker for the Saskatchewan Roughriders in the Canadian Football League (CFL) from 1958 to 1964 and was a dominant player at his position of center.

CFL
As a member of the Saskatchewan Roughriders, Neil Habig played center and linebacker. In 7 years (1958-1964), Habig was a CFL All-Star center once (1962, the first year this honor was awarded) and a Western conference all-star 6 times (1959-1964). As a linebacker, he was particularly adept at covering the pass, as indicated by his 10 career interceptions, including 6 in a single year (1963). Despite this prowess, his team reached the Western finals only once, in 1963, and lost to the BC Lions, so that he never played in a Grey cup game. He was replaced in 1965 by Ted Urness, a CFL All-Star center himself for the next 6 years.

References

1936 births
Living people
People from West Lafayette, Indiana
Players of American football from Indiana
Purdue Boilermakers football players
American players of Canadian football
Canadian football offensive linemen
Saskatchewan Roughriders players